Euphorbia socotrana is a species of plant in the family Euphorbiaceae. It is endemic to Yemen.  Its natural habitats are subtropical or tropical dry forests and subtropical or tropical dry shrubland.

References

socotrana
Endemic flora of Socotra
Vulnerable flora of Africa
Vulnerable flora of Asia
Taxonomy articles created by Polbot
Plants described in 1884
Taxa named by Isaac Bayley Balfour